"The High Road" is a song by Canadian rock band Three Days Grace, released as the second single from their fourth studio album Transit of Venus on January 22, 2013.

Commercial performance
It reached No. 1 on the Billboard Mainstream Rock chart. This is the band's first song to not enter the top 20 on the Billboard Alternative Songs peaking at No. 24 since "Riot" peaked at No. 21 in 2007. On the week of December 22, 2012, the song entered the Canada Rock chart making it the last song from the band to enter the chart before Adam Gontier's departure in January 2013.

Lyric video
A lyric video for the song was released on their YouTube and Vevo channel on January 7, 2013.

Charts

Weekly charts

Year-end charts

Certification

References

Three Days Grace songs
2012 songs
2013 singles
RCA Records singles
Songs written by Adam Gontier
Songs written by Chris Tompkins